The IBC Recording Studios were independent recording studios located at 35 Portland Place in London, England. In the 1960s and 1970s, the studios become internationally famous after being used by recording artists like the Kinks, the Who, Bee Gees, Cream and others.

History

In 1930, Leonard Plugge established the International Broadcasting Company (IBC) as a commercial rival to the BBC, with IBC's studios utilized for radio production work. In the years following World War II, IBC's work gradually shifted from radio production to music production, and in 1962, Plugge sold the studios to BBC conductor Eric Robinson and musician George Clouston. Bolstered by the success of clients like the Who, IBC was regarded as one of the top recording studios in London in the late 1960s.

In July, 1978, IBC was bought by musician Chas Chandler, who renamed them Portland Recording Studios. The address was also home to George Peckham's cutting rooms (Porky Prime Cuts) and Radiotracks Studios, a company specialising in recording and producing radio commercials. The studios were later bought by Don Arden for use by his Jet Records label, and run by his son David Arden.

Today, the studios are occupied by Musion das Hologram Ltd, which uses the space to demonstrate its life-size hologram technology and to record footage for broadcast as holographic images. Madonna used the system to appear as her virtual self at the Grammy Awards.

Legacy
IBC manufactured much of its own equipment under the direction of Denis King. The quadraphonic mixing desk designed in the early 1970s was still in use in the late 1980s by Radiotracks, although in a different building. The desk had been built to take advantage of the quadraphonic technology that had been pioneered for music, although this never became popular, and the desk was never used for that purpose in its music days. Instead the quadraphonic system on the desk was put to good use for mixing soundtracks for large events, including a celebration of 800 years of the Lord Mayors of London at the Guildhall. Although all the large mixing desks were dismantled, one smaller desk, a nine-into-three desk used for locations recording, still exists and is in private hands. The small, fully transistorised desk, built around 1958, was used to record "My Old Man's a Dustman" by Lonnie Donegan in 1960.

Many notable recording engineers worked at IBC, including Glyn Johns, Joe Meek, and Denis Preston, with Meek and Preston going on to found Lansdowne Studios in London. Additionally, the sound samples for the pioneering Mellotron keyboard were recorded at the studios in the early 1960s.

Recording artists
Notable artists who have recorded at IBC Studios include the following:
The Action
Adam Faith
The Beatles, in Around the Beatles
Bee Gees
Billy J Kramer
Petula Clark 
Chick Corea
Cream
Deep Purple
Duane Eddy
The Easybeats 
Elton John
The Equals
Golden Earring
Harmony Grass
Jimi Hendrix
Jimmy Page
The Kinks
London
Lori Balmer
The Marbles
P.P. Arnold
The Rockin' Ramrods
Rod Stewart
The Rolling Stones
Samantha Sang
Slade
The Small Faces 
Status Quo 
Tony Blackburn
Thunderclap Newman
The Who
Tim Hardin
Tin Tin
The Peddlers
Roy Phillips
The Lancastrians

References

External links

Musion.com - Musion das Hologram worldwide home site

Recording studios in London